Nick Larkey (born 6 June 1998) is a professional Australian rules footballer playing for the North Melbourne Football Club in the Australian Football League (AFL). He was drafted by North Melbourne with their fourth selection and seventy-third overall in the 2016 national draft. In 2018 he won the VFL's leading goal-kicker award, the  Jim 'Frosty' Miller Medal, after kicking 41 goals across 17 matches with the North Melbourne reserves team in that competition.
Larkey played his 50th AFL game in round 22 of the 2021 season.

References

External links

1998 births
Living people
North Melbourne Football Club players
Oakleigh Chargers players
Australian rules footballers from Victoria (Australia)